Ynez Seabury  (June 26, 1907 – April 11, 1973) was an American actress of the stage, silent and early sound film era. She began her career as a child actor, making her screen debut in D. W. Griffith's The Miser's Heart (1911). She appeared on Broadway and occasionally  appear in films during the early sound era. Her last credited feature film appearance was in Cecil B. DeMille's North West Mounted Police (1940).

Biography

Early life
Ynez Seabury was born June 26, 1907 in Portland, Oregon to actors Charlotte and Forrest Seabury. Her father was a prominent stage actor from Oakland, California, and a direct descendent of Samuel Seabury, while her maternal great-grandfather, Louis Mario Peralta—a founder of the city of Oakland—was sent to San Francisco from his native Spain by King Charles III.

Seabury had an itinerant childhood due to both of her parents' careers as performers. At age two, Seabury won the prize for "Prettiest Baby" at the Scranton Timess baby show in Luna Park.

Career

Seabury was acting in movies by the age of 4, debuting as Little Kathy in D. W. Griffith's The Miser's Heart (1911). Seabury appeared in numerous films for Griffith from 1911 to 1912, including A Woman Scorned, The Voice of the Child, Billy's Stratagem, For His Son, The Sunbeam, A String of Pearls, and The Root of Evil. In 1912, she made her debut on Broadway in Racketty-Packetty House. In June 1912, Seabury appeared opposite her father in a Portland-based stage production of Madame Butterfly for the Baker Stock Company.

Due to her darker features, Seabury was frequently cast in ethnic roles, portraying Italians and Native Americans. In 1924, she starred as a Native American woman in Red Clay (1924), a film which starred William Desmond and Albert J. Smith. The plot was constructed around an Indian's education and his subsequent social ostracism. In her role as the Indian maid Miss Seabury earned acclaim for the "very fine emotional quality" of her work.

In March 1928, she subsequently  participated in His Blossom Bride, a romantic drama of the stage produced by Richard Walton Tully, premiering at the Mason opera house in Los Angeles in March 1928. The scenery and lighting for the play showed an opening prologue in the Painted Desert of Arizona and the Hopi Indian reservation. Members of the Hopi tribe were adopted by Seabury, who portrayed the Indian heroine. Seabury was revered by the Hopi because of her understanding of their lives and ambitions. Before serving as background actors in the production, twenty-nine tribesmen and their chief toured Los Angeles in Cadillacs and La Salles.

On November 3, 1928, she wed broker Walter William Costello.

In 1937, she was a member of the cast of the CBS Radio Theater dramatization of Brewster's Millions, which featured Jack Benny and Mary Livingstone.

Later years and death
Seabury died in Sherman Oaks, California on April 11, 1973. She is buried at the Forest Lawn Memorial Park cemetery in Glendale, California.

Partial filmography

References

Further reading
Los Angeles Times, "From Old Family", December 2, 1925, Page III 17.
Los Angeles Times, "Years Roll Backward for Stage Actor", May 12, 1927, Page A9.
Los Angeles Times, "Tully Drama Is Polished", March 18, 1928, Page C13.
Los Angeles Times, "Brewster's Millions", February 15, 1937, Page A15.

External links

1907 births
1973 deaths
American child actresses
American film actresses
American people of English descent
American people of Spanish descent
American silent film actresses
American stage actresses
Actresses from Portland, Oregon
Burials at Forest Lawn Memorial Park (Glendale)
Hispanic and Latino American actresses
20th-century American actresses